The 1983 All-SEC football team consists of American football players selected to the All-Southeastern Conference (SEC) chosen by various selectors for the 1983 NCAA Division I-A football season.

Offensive selections

Receivers

 Dwayne Dixon, Florida (AP-1, UPI)
Eric Martin, LSU (AP-1)
Joey Jones, Alabama (AP-2)

Tight ends 

 Chuck Scott, Vanderbilt (AP-1, UPI)
Clarence Kay, Georgia (AP-2)

Tackles
Guy McIntyre, Georgia (AP-1, UPI)
Pat Arrington, Auburn (AP-1, UPI)
Lomas Brown, Florida (AP-2)
Winford Hood, Georgia (AP-2)

Guards 
David Jordan, Auburn (AP-1, UPI)
Mike Adcock, Alabama (AP-1)
Bill Mayo, Tennessee (AP-2, UPI)
John Hunt, Florida (AP-2)

Centers 
Glenn Streno, Tennessee (AP-2, UPI)

Quarterbacks 

 Walter Lewis, Alabama (AP-1, UPI)
Wayne Peace, Florida (AP-2)

Running backs 

 Bo Jackson, Auburn (AP-1, UPI)
Johnnie Jones, Tennessee (AP-1, UPI)
Ricky Moore, Alabama (AP-1, UPI)
Lionel James, Auburn (AP-2)
Neal Anderson, Florida (AP-2)
Ricky Edwards, Vanderbilt (AP-2)

Defensive selections

Ends
Freddie Gilbert, Georgia (AP-1, UPI)
 Reggie White, Tennessee (AP-1, UPI)
Steve Bearden, Vanderbilt (AP-1)
Gerald Robinson, Auburn (AP-2)
Emanuel King, Alabama (AP-2)

Tackles 
Doug Smith, Auburn (AP-1, UPI)
Donnie Humphrey, Auburn (AP-2, UPI)
Andre Townsend, Ole Miss (AP-2)

Middle guards
Dowe Aughtman, Auburn (AP-1, UPI)
Tim Newton, Florida (AP-2)

Linebackers 
 Wilber Marshall, Florida (AP-1, UPI)
 Billy Jackson, Miss. St. (AP-1, UPI)
Tommy Thurson, Georgia (AP-2, UPI)
Gregg Carr, Auburn (AP-1)
Knox Culpepper, Georgia (AP-2)
Alvin Toles, Tennessee (AP-2)

Backs 
Terry Hoage, Georgia (AP-1, UPI)
Leonard Coleman, Vanderbilt (AP-1, UPI)
David King, Auburn (AP-2, UPI)
Tony Lilly, Florida (AP-1)
Kerry Baird, Kentucky (AP-2)
Liffort Hobley, LSU (AP-2)

Special teams

Kicker 
Kevin Butler, Georgia (AP-1, UPI)
Van Tiffen, Alabama (AP-2)

Punter 
 Paul Calhoun, Kentucky (AP-1)
 Ricky Anderson, Vanderbilt (UPI)
Ray Criswell, Florida (AP-2)

Key
AP = Associated Press

UPI = United Press International

Bold = Consensus first-team selection by both AP and UPI

See also
1983 College Football All-America Team

References

All-SEC
All-SEC football teams